Helicotomidae is an extinct family of Paleozoic molluscs (gastropods?) with anisostrophically coiled shells of uncertain position (Gastropoda?) (according to the taxonomy of the Gastropoda by Bouchet & Rocroi, 2005).

Taxonomy 
The taxonomy of the Gastropoda by Bouchet & Rocroi, 2005 categorizes Helicotomidae in the superfamilia Euomphaloidea within the Paleozoic molluscs with anisostrophically coiled shells of uncertain position (Gastropoda?). This family has no subfamilies.

Genera 
Genera in the family Helicotomidae include:
 Amphelissa
 Boucotspira
 Boucotspira
 Burdikinia - synonym: Polyamma.
 Colpomphalus
 Helicotoma Satler, 1859 - type genus of the family Helicotomidae
 Lophonema - synonym: Polhemia.
 Ophiletina
 Palaeomphalus
 Paraviviana
 Walcottoma
 Yochelsoniella

References 

Prehistoric mollusc families
Paleozoic molluscs